MA-60 or MA 60 may refer to: 

Massachusetts Route 60, a road in the U.S.
Xian MA60, a Chinese airliner